Norbert Siegmann (born 20 May 1953) is a German former professional footballer who played as a defender or midfielder. He spent 11 seasons in the Bundesliga with VfB Stuttgart, Tennis Borussia Berlin and SV Werder Bremen. He is probably best known for seriously injuring Ewald Lienen in 1981. That foul was called "the best-known foul in the history of the Bundesliga".

Honours 
Werder Bremen
 Bundesliga runner-up: 1983, 1985

References

External links 
 

1953 births
Living people
German footballers
Association football defenders
Association football midfielders
Bundesliga players
2. Bundesliga players
Wacker 04 Berlin players
VfB Stuttgart players
Tennis Borussia Berlin players
SV Werder Bremen players
SC Fortuna Köln players
German football managers